Markku Koski (born 15 October 1981) is a Finnish professional snowboarder from Sievi. He is well known within the snowboarding community for his consistent showing in half-pipe competitions and for his video parts with Standard Films. Koski won the bronze medal at 2006 Winter Olympics in the Halfpipe competition, and he won a gold medal in the Big Air competition at the 2009 Snowboard World Championships.

References 
 FIS-Ski.com Biography/Results

1981 births
Living people
Snowboarders at the 2002 Winter Olympics
Snowboarders at the 2006 Winter Olympics
Snowboarders at the 2010 Winter Olympics
Finnish male snowboarders
Olympic snowboarders of Finland
Olympic bronze medalists for Finland
Olympic medalists in snowboarding
Medalists at the 2006 Winter Olympics
X Games athletes
People from Sievi
Sportspeople from North Ostrobothnia
21st-century Finnish people